The Pancha Kashmiri Takiya Masjid commonly known as the Kashmiri Masjid, build in 15th century AD, is one of the oldest mosques of Nepal.

Muslims from Kashmir entered Nepal for trade during the time of king Ratna Malla and the mosque was built in the time of king Pratap Malla. The mosque has undergone multiple renovations. More Kashmiri people came to Kathmandu due to violence in Kashmire. The current mosque was built in the times of king Prithvi Narayan Shah after the Muslims helped him to spy on Malla rulers.

The mosque has three complexes viz. a prayer hall, an annexe and a madrasah. The tombs of Haji Mishkin Shah and Khwaja Gyasuddin Shah are inside the premises.

See also
List of mosques in Nepal

References

Barelvi mosques
Mosques in Nepal
Cemeteries in Nepal
15th-century establishments in Nepal